The Longmyndian Supergroup is a  sequence of Late Precambrian rocks that outcrop between the Pontesford–Linley Fault System and the Church Stretton Fault System in the Welsh Borderland Fault System. The supergroup consists of two major geological groups, the Stretton Group and the overlying Wentnor Group. The rocks are a generally regressive sequence from basinal facies to clastic sedimentation. The rocks are thought to be derived from Uriconian mountains that were formed during the southward subduction of an oceanic plate beneath a continental block (ocean closure). The rocks have since been folded due to fault movements and plunge gently to the south.

The Longmyndian rocks were deposited in northeast–southwest trending faulted rift basins.  These were deposited on top of the Uriconian volcaniclastic deposits.  Subsequent ocean closure squeezed these rocks together to provide sub-vertical bedding in the synclinal sequence we see in exposed rocks today.
As noted below, the deposited rocks of the Longmyndian show a variety of depositional facies that tell a story of ocean closure. The Longmyndian deposits rest upon Uriconian rocks but different sections are exposed exclusively between the Church Stretton Fault and the Pontesford-Linley Lineament.

Wentnor Group

The Wentnor Group is made up of the fluvial deposits of the Bridges Formation and is the topmost of the supergroup. This is underlain by the braided deposits of the Bayston-Oakwood Formation which completes the Wentnor Group.

Stretton Group
The topmost of the Stretton Group, the Portway Formation, consists of braided fluvial deposits with marine incursions.  The underlying Lightspout Formation is interpreted as a fluvio-deltaic environment, this is succeeded by a similar facies in the Synalds Formation. Turbidite facies are prevalent in the Burway Formation and the deep marine basinal environments continue toward the base of the supergroup within the Stretton Shale Formation. The Ragleth Tuff Formation completes the Stretton Group and the supergroup sequence.

Dating

References

External links 
 Shropshire Geology

Geology of Shropshire
Precambrian Europe
Geology of Wales